Boreolestes likharevi is a species of predatory air-breathing land slug, a shell-less pulmonate gastropod mollusk in the family Trigonochlamydidae.

Boreolestes likharevi is the type species of the genus Boreolestes.

The specific name likharevi is in honor of the Russian malacologist Ilya Mikhailovich Likharev.

Distribution
The type locality for Boreolestes likharevi is the west-facing slope of Mount Oshten, Oshten-Fisht Mountains, North-Western Caucasus, Republic of Adygea, Russia.

References

Trigonochlamydidae
Gastropods described in 1999